Bo Andersson may refer to:

Bo Andersson (businessman) (born 1955), Swedish businessman
Bo Andersson (curler) (born 1956), Swedish curler
Bo Andersson (footballer) (born 1968), Swedish footballer
Bo Andersson (Mjällby AIF footballer), Swedish footballer
Bo Andersson (handballer) (born 1951), Swedish handball player

See also
Bo Anderson, American Brazilian DJ, known as Maga Bo